Oscar and the Lady in Pink is a 2009 French-Belgian-Canadian drama film written and directed by Éric-Emmanuel Schmitt. It is based on the novel with the same name.

Cast 
 Michèle Laroque: Rose
 Amir Ben Abdelmoumen: Oscar
 Max von Sydow: Dr. Dusseldorf
 Amira Casar: Mrs. Gommette
 Mylène Demongeot: Lily, Rose's mother
 Mathilde Goffart: Peggy Blue
 Constance Dollé: Oscar's Mother
 Jérôme Kircher: Oscar's father

Summary

External links 

2009 drama films
2009 films
French drama films
Canadian drama films
Films based on French novels
French-language Canadian films
2000s Canadian films
2000s French films
2000s French-language films